Anthony Burton is a former director of the V&A Museum of Childhood and an expert on the history of childhood.

Burton worked for the museum from 1968 to 2002. He spent sixteen years as head of the Museum of Childhood at Bethnal Green, after which he returned to South Kensington where he was involved in the Museum's oral history project, taking recollections from former members of staff.

Burton is a visiting lecturer at Kingston University, London.

Selected publications
Children's Pleasures. London: Victoria & Albert Museum, 1996. 
Bethnal Green Museum of Childhood London: Victoria & Albert Museum, 2nd revised edition, 1997. 
Vision & Accident: The story of the Victoria & Albert Museum. London: Victoria & Albert Museum, 1999. 
The Great Exhibitor: The Life and Work of Henry Cole. London: Victoria & Albert Museum, 2003. (With Elizabeth Bonython)

References 

People associated with the Victoria and Albert Museum
Living people
Year of birth missing (living people)